Jujubinus polychroma is a species of sea snail, a marine gastropod mollusk in the family Trochidae, the top snails.

Description
The length of the shell varies between 12 mm and 18 mm. The perforate shell has a turreted-conic shape. It is, green, painted with undulating white bands, varied with buff angular lines. The plane whorls are subimbricating. They are ornamented with a slightly prominent articulated margin, subdistant impressed transverse lines, and longitudinally substriated. The body whorl is angulate The base of the shell is a little convex, sculptured with cinguli articulated with buff The aperture is subquadrate and green inside. The columella is straight subtruncate at its base.

Distribution
This species occurs in the Indo-Pacific and off Australia

References

 Reeve, L.A. 1863. Monograph of the genus Zizyphinus. pls 2–8 in Reeve, L.A. (ed). Conchologia Iconica. London : L. Reeve & Co. Vol. 14
 Melvill, J.C. & Standen, R., 1901. The Mollusca of the Persian Gulf, Gulf of Oman and Arabian Sea, as evidenced mainly through the collections of Mr F.W. Townsend, 1893-1900; with descriptions of new species. Part 1. Cephalopoda, Gastropoda, Scaphopoda. Proc. Zool. Soc. Lond., 2(1):327-4602124.
 Schepman, M.M., 1908 [31/Dec/1908]. Prosobranchia (excluding Heteropoda and parasitic Prosobranchia). Rhipidoglossa and Docoglossa. With an appendix by Prof. R. Bergh [Pectinobranchiata]. Siboga Expedition, 49(1):1-1089.
 Thiele, J. 1930. Gastropoda und Bivalvia. pp. 561–596 in Michaelsen, W. & Hartmayer, R. (eds). Die Fauna Südwest-Australiens. Jena : Gustav Fischer Vol. 5
 Ponder, W.F., 1978 [31/Dec/1978]. The unfigured Mollusca of J. Thiele. 1930 published in Die Fauna Sudwest-Australiens. Records of the Western Australian Museum, 6(4):423-441.
 Satyamurti, S.T., 1952. Mollusca of Krusadai Is. I. Amphineura and Gastropoda. Bull. Madras Govt. Mus.; Nat. Hist.n.s., 1(2)(6):1-267
 Dekker H. (2006). Description of a new species of Kanekotrochus (Gastropoda: Trochidae) from Vietnam. Miscellanea Malacologia, 2(1): 1-4

External links
 To World Register of Marine Species
 
 Adams, A. 1851. Contributions towards a monograph of the Trochidae, a family of gastropodous Mollusca. Proceedings of the Zoological Society of London 1851(19): 150-192

polychroma
Gastropods of Australia
Gastropods described in 1853